Sir Thomas Edward McConnell (7 April 1868 – 22 May 1938) was a unionist politician in Northern Ireland.

McConnell studied at the Royal Belfast Academical Institution before becoming the managing director of a horse and cattle sales firm.  He was elected to the Belfast Corporation as a councillor and then an alderman, for the Ulster Unionist Party.  He was also successful at the 1921 Belfast Duncairn by-election, and when his seat was abolished the next year, he won Belfast North, for which he sat until 1929.

References

External links 
 
 

1868 births
1938 deaths
High Sheriffs of Belfast
Members of Belfast City Council
Members of the Parliament of the United Kingdom for Belfast constituencies (since 1922)
Members of the Parliament of the United Kingdom for Belfast constituencies (1801–1922)
People educated at the Royal Belfast Academical Institution
UK MPs 1918–1922
UK MPs 1922–1923
UK MPs 1923–1924
UK MPs 1924–1929
Ulster Unionist Party members of the House of Commons of the United Kingdom
Knights Bachelor